Cavaliers: An Anthology 1973–1974 is a remastered four-disc box-set anthology by Cockney Rebel, released in 2012. The set chronicles the recording career of the original line-up of Cockney Rebel, between 1973 and 1974. It includes both of the band's albums The Human Menagerie (1973) and The Psychomodo (1974), as well as all the singles and non-album B-Sides. It also features early alternative versions and mixes of tracks from both albums, as well as live sessions for the BBC, including a John Peel session and on the Old Grey Whistle Test.

Cavaliers: An Anthology 1973–1974 was released on CD in the UK and Europe. The set was mastered and remastered at Abbey Road Studios by Adam Nunn. The liner notes, under the heading "Young, Feisty and Fearless", were written by Harley, in which he recalls the writing of the songs, the early stages of his career, the formation of Cockney Rebel and the recording of the two albums with the original line-up.

Harley also revealed in the liner notes that he was considering performing the two Cockney Rebel albums in their entirety. Later that year, on 24 November, Harley and his band would perform the two albums at the Birmingham Symphony Hall, with a 50-piece orchestra and chamber choir. The performance was released in 2013, titled Birmingham (Live with Orchestra & Choir).

Content
Disc One features The Human Menagerie, along with four bonus tracks. A DJ Edit of "Sebastian" was originally created to send to DJs for radio play. "Rock and Roll Parade" was B-Side to "Sebastian". "Judy Teen" was the band's first UK hit in 1974, with the B-Side being "Spaced Out".

Disc Two features The Psychomodo, along with two bonus tracks. "Such a Dream" was the B-Side to "Mr. Soft", while "Big Big Deal" was released in November 1974 as Harley's non-album solo debut.

Disc Three largely consists of previously unreleased alternative versions, as well as other mixes, mainly of The Human Menagerie album. The alternative versions had been recently discovered at the time. The early version of "Judy Teen" is dated 1 March 1973, recorded at Audio International Studios. A stereo mix of "Crazy Raver" is included, along with an unedited version of "Rock and Roll Parade", an alternative mix of "Mr. Soft" and the full version of "Big Big Deal".

Disc Four features live performances from the band at the BBC in Concert, on the Old Grey Whistle Test and a John Peel Session. The five tracks from the band 'In Concert' at the BBC were recorded on 22 January 1974 at the Hippodrome, Golders Green in London. It was first transmitted on 26 January 1974, and was introduced by Pete Drummond. The two tracks from the Old Grey Whistle Test were recorded on 10 February 1974 at the BBC TV Centre in London. The John Peel session, featuring five tracks, was produced by Tony Wilson for the BBC. It was recorded at Langham 1 on 28 May 1974, and was first transmitted on 11 June 1974. The two Old Grey Whistle Test tracks had not appeared on CD before, while much of the other performances on Disc Four had been previously released on the 1995 Windsong International compilation Live at the BBC.

Track listing
All songs written and composed by Steve Harley.

Disc one

Disc two

Disc three

Disc four

Critical reception

Upon release, Q reviewed the anthology and wrote: "These first two albums, spread over four CDs to encompass demos, live versions and extraneous singles, show how close Harley came to greatness." Jim Wirth of Uncut described the set as a "4CD triumph for art-pop's 'Cocky Rabble'". He added: "The high-concept theatrical rock showcased on Cockney Rebel's first two albums is bigger on bravado than innovation, but Harley's determination, control freakery, and incipient narcissism scythe compellingly through Cavaliers, demo recordings, Peel Sessions, live material and all." Mojo described the compilation as "Steve Harley's glam origins across four CDs. Melodically rich, playful and charismatic."

Stephen Thomas Erlewine of AllMusic commented: "This collection is not for the casual fan, but rather for those who want to dig deep, and those may not be limited to Harley fanatics, either. During these early years, Cockney Rebel blurred the lines between prog, glam, Canterbury, Roxy, and other arty flights of fancy, slowly gathering a sense of style and flash. The Human Menagerie is a little gangly but The Psychomodo is a full-stop gem, and fortunately that's the period that gets the greatest exploration here. Certainly, this box is for serious listeners, but it offers plenty of surprises and pleasures within its four discs."

Personnel
Cockney Rebel
 Steve Harley – vocals
 Jean-Paul Crocker – electric violin, guitars, mandolin
 Milton Reame-James – keyboards
 Paul Jeffreys – Fender bass
 Stuart Elliott – drums, percussion

The Human Menagerie
 Neil Harrison – producer
 Geoff Emerick – engineer
 Andrew Powell – orchestral arrangements
 Star Trek Enterprises – original sleeve design
 Peter Vernon – photography

The Psychomodo
 Steve Harley – producer
 Alan Parsons – producer
 Peter Flanagan (Morgan Studios) – engineer
 Richard Dodd (Nova Studios) – engineer
 Geoff Emerick (AIR London) – engineer
 John Middleton (AIR London) – engineer
 Andrew Powell – orchestral arrangements
 Mick Rock – original sleeve design, photography

Other
 Neil Harrison – producer of "Rock and Roll Parade"
 Steve Harley – producer of "Judy Teen", "Spaced Out", "Such a Dream" and "Big Big Deal"
 Alan Parsons – producer of "Judy Teen", "Spaced Out" and "Such a Dream"
 Pete Coleman – engineer on "Judy Teen (Early Version)"
 Pete Swettenham – engineer on "Big Big Deal"
 Tony Wilson – producer of 1974 BBC John Peel session tracks

Anthology
 Nigel Reeve – EMI A&R, project co-ordination
 Hugh Gilmour – EMI A&R, artwork design
 Demetri Georgiou – project co-ordination
 Peter Vernon – photography (where known)
 Adam Nunn – mastering, remastering
 Clive Munday, Graeme Anderson (at EMI) – thanks
 Cary Anning, Ian Pickavance, Lucy Launder (at Abbey Road Studios) – thanks
 Simon Gurney (at BBC Worldwide) – thanks
 Stewart Griffin (assistance and memorabilia) – thanks
 Rachel (at Comeuppance Ltd.) – thanks

References

2012 compilation albums